King's Mate (also known as Account Rendered) is a 1928 romantic adventure novel by the British writer and explorer Rosita Forbes. While staying in Morocco a young Englishwoman becomes lost in the desert and is rescued by a mysterious figure known as the White Sheik, who proves to be an Englishman.

Film adaptation
It was made into the 1928 British silent film The White Sheik directed by Harley Knoles and starring Lillian Hall-Davis, Warwick Ward and Jameson Thomas.

References

Bibliography
 Goble, Alan. The Complete Index to Literary Sources in Film. Walter de Gruyter, 1999.
Liggins, Emma & Nolan, Elizabeth. Women's Writing of the First World War. Routledge, 2019.
 Watson, George & Willison, Ian R. The New Cambridge Bibliography of English Literature, Volume 4. CUP, 1972.

1928 British novels
Novels by Rosita Forbes
British romance novels
British adventure novels
Novels set in Morocco
British novels adapted into films
Cassell (publisher) books